Kelliher is a village in the Canadian province of Saskatchewan within the Rural Municipality of Kellross No. 247 and Census Division No. 10. The village is located about 140 km north of the City of Regina.

History 
Kelliher incorporated as a village on April 27, 1909.

Geography

Climate

Demographics 

See also 

 List of communities in Saskatchewan
 Villages of Saskatchewan

References

Villages in Saskatchewan
Rural Municipality of Kellross No. 247
Division No. 10, Saskatchewan